The Prima Diesel-electric locomotives are a class of medium and heavy, four- and six-axle, passenger and freight mainline locomotives. They have been built both to  standard and  broad gauges, and find use in the Middle East, Europe and North America. Alstom is the primary designer in cooperation with both General Motors (now EMD) and Siemens.

History

Initially the Prima locomotives were electric only, with the technology demonstrator and test platform being built in 2002 in Belfort France by Alstom. Next came the Prima 6000 technology demonstrator; this too was an electric locomotive, with 6000 kW of power and primarily intended to test and demonstrate multi-voltage operations for European cross-border operations. Orders for the Prima electrics came, mostly from SNCF.

A series of diesel locomotives also associated with the Prima name were also built. These were the General Motors (GM)-engined machines built by Alstom at its Spanish plant in Valencia, and Ruston-engined locomotives built in Belfort, France.

The Valencia plant was sold to Vossloh in 2004. Locomotives continued to be built there using EMD engines and electrical transmission systems - including almost total rebuilds of the RENFE 333 class. Vossloh changed the names of the products produced there to the "Vossloh Euro" platform (see Vossloh Euro locomotives) and the end came of the association of the Valencia plant with the Prima name.

Also produced in the 1990s were Prima diesels countries outside Europe. The DE32C was produced for Chemins de Fer Syriens in Syria, and Sri Lanka received 10 locomotives which it designated M9 class. A DE43C model was exported to Iran (AD43C). Nevertheless, the Euro 3000 and Euro 4000 products produced at Vossloh España continue to show similarities with the earlier Prima products—such as the centrally located driver position with radially located controls, the single drivers window, and general body shape and design of the rigid body shell.

Alstom and Siemens collaborated to produce the BB 75000 diesel, which has received orders for at least 400 locomotives from SNCF with a possibility of 100 more. A Siemens/Alstom BB 75000 mock-up was unveiled on 25 March 2004, The first locomotive was produced in 2006.

In 2008 Alstom unveiled the 'Prima II' platform; diesel versions are to be offered, so it is expected that further models of the Prima diesel locomotive family will appear.

Technology

The Prima type locomotives built at Alstom's Valencia plant were engined with General motors engines; in fact the entire power train - engine, generator, electronics and motors were supplied by General Motors for the Valencia built Primas. For the locomotives built in France - primarily those exported outside Europe Ruston engines were used. The Prima diesels for SNCF Fret used MTU engines.

Modern innovations in the Prima class included - a centrally located drivers seat with ergonomically arranged controls, a monocoque rigid bodyshell.

The BB 75000 retains the Prima appearance - the single window, drivers position, body design, but the 'innards' are supplied by Siemens, the engine from Caterpiller.

Variants

RENFE 334

These were the last of the Valencia-built Prima locomotives and technically should be considered part of the Vossloh Euro series of locomotives since they came off the production line after 2004. Built for passenger work on non-electrified lines in Spain, and were intended to replace older Class 333s.

References

External links

 
th:เอแอลดี